Trifolium reflexum, the Buffalo Clover, is a species of clover native to the Eastern United States. It is found in areas of natural openings including woodlands, glades, and prairies, often in acidic areas. It is an annual or biennial that produces white to dark pink flowers in the late spring.

Like many native clovers of the Eastern United States, Trifolium reflexum's populations have declined considerably in the past 200 years. For this species, fire suppression is indicated as a significant cause for decline.

Gallery

References

reflexum
Taxa named by Carl Linnaeus